Burnley Football Club is an English professional association football club, founded in 1882. Burnley first played against foreign opposition—Scottish club Cowlairs—in 1885, and embarked on their first overseas tour in 1914, playing sides from the German Empire and Austria-Hungary. Further trips to foreign countries followed in the next decades. In 1955, UEFA launched the first officially sanctioned European club competition, the European Cup. Burnley won their second First Division title in 1959–60, qualifying for the 1960–61 European Cup. They eliminated French champions Stade de Reims in the first round before being sent out of the contest by West German champions Hamburger SV in the quarter-final. Burnley's next campaign in a European club competition came six years later, in the 1966–67 Inter-Cities Fairs Cup, where they were again eliminated by a West German side (Eintracht Frankfurt) in the quarter-final. In 2018, Burnley qualified for the 2018–19 UEFA Europa League, reaching the play-off round.

The side also competed in minor international football tournaments in the 1970s and early 1980s. Burnley participated in two editions of the Texaco Cup, a competition involving sides from England, Scotland, Northern Ireland and the Republic of Ireland that had not qualified for UEFA-sanctioned European competitions or the Inter-Cities Fairs Cup. They reached the 1974 final but lost against Newcastle United after extra time. Burnley later competed in the Anglo-Scottish Cup—the Texaco Cup's successor—on five occasions and won the tournament in 1978–79, after they defeated Oldham Athletic 4–2 on aggregate in the final.

History

Foreign opponents and overseas tours
Burnley were founded in May 1882, and initially played their matches against local clubs. In January 1885, Burnley's committee invited Scottish clubs Cowlairs, Kilmarnock, and Glasgow Northern to play friendlies at Burnley's home ground, Turf Moor. Cowlairs were Burnley's first foreign opponents; the match ended in a 2–2 draw. Burnley subsequently lost 3–2 to Kilmarnock, but defeated Northern 4–0. Several weeks after winning the 1914 FA Cup, the club embarked on its first tour to continental Europe, playing sides from the German Empire and Austria-Hungary. Burnley won their first match with foreign opposition on foreign soil; 2–1 against Viktoria Berlin. Scottish Cup winners Celtic also made a trip to the continent; Hungarian club Ferencváros put up a vase—the Budapest Cup—for a charity match between Burnley and Celtic in Budapest. The game ended in a draw, with a replay held at Turf Moor several months later, which Celtic won 2–1. Burnley embarked on a tour to Italy during the off-season in 1922—which included a 1–0 victory against Football League champions Liverpool in Milan—and to Germany and the Netherlands in 1927, where they won five of six matches and scored thirty goals.

During the late 1940s and the 1950s, the club embarked on several overseas tours. During their trip in Spain in 1949, Burnley defeated Barcelona 1–0 at Barça's Camp de Les Corts. Burnley remained unbeaten during their stay in Turkey in 1951, defeating Fenerbahçe 3–2 and drawing with Beşiktaş and Galatasaray. In 1954, Burnley travelled to the African island nations Madagascar and Mauritius. They won all 7 matches—including a 14–1 victory against Madagascan side Tananarive—scoring 48 goals. Fifty years later, Mauritian newspaper L'Express described Burnley's 1954 tour as "innovative" as the Mauritian footballers made acquaintance with new footballing techniques.

In 1955, UEFA launched the first officially sanctioned European club competition, the European Cup—a tournament contested between several national champions and other European sides. Burnley won their second First Division title in 1959–60 under the management of Harry Potts. The club's squad consisted of mostly players who came through the Burnley youth academy; a transfer fee was paid for only two players—for Jimmy McIlroy in 1950 and for Alex Elder in 1959. After the 1959–60 season ended, the team travelled to the United States to represent England in the International Soccer League, the first modern international American soccer tournament. Burnley defeated Bayern Munich (West Germany), Glenavon (Northern Ireland) and Nice (France) but finished runners-up in the group stage behind Kilmarnock.

1960–61 European Cup
As a result of their First Division title, Burnley played the following season in European competition for the first time, in the 1960–61 European Cup. They were the third English club in the European Cup, preceded by Manchester United and Wolverhampton Wanderers. Burnley received a bye in the preliminary round and were drawn against French club Stade de Reims in the first round. Reims were the 1959–60 French Division 1 champions, and were European Cup runners-up in 1956 and 1959. The first leg was played at Turf Moor, with Burnley winning 2–0: Jimmy Robson scored in the first minute and McIlroy netted a second in the 22nd minute. The return leg, played two weeks later at Parc des Princes in Paris, ended in a 3–2 loss, although Robson had put Burnley 1–0 ahead. During the game, Potts ran on the pitch to put the ball back to its correct place during a Reims free-kick, having become exasperated by their several attempts to steal a few yards, after which he was taken off the field by the local police. Despite the loss and crowd disturbances, Burnley won 4–3 on aggregate and progressed to the quarter-final, in which the club faced West German champions Hamburger SV. At Turf Moor, in front of around 46,000 spectators, Brian Pilkington scored twice to put Burnley 2–0 up with Robson adding a third, before Hamburg pulled one back in the last minutes of the game. The second leg was played two months later at the Volksparkstadion and was broadcast live on the BBC. Uwe Seeler scored twice in a 4–1 win for Hamburg; McIlroy hit the post in the last minute and Burnley were eliminated from the competition.

1966–67 Inter-Cities Fairs Cup

The maximum wage in the Football League was abolished in 1961, which meant that clubs from small towns like Burnley could no longer compete financially with sides from bigger towns and cities, and damaged Burnley's fortunes. The side ventured back into international football competition, however, with qualification for the 1966–67 Inter-Cities Fairs Cup due to a third-place finish in the 1965–66 First Division. The Inter-Cities Fairs Cup was another European competition which started in 1955. It was organised by the Fairs Cup committee, which was backed by several FIFA executive committee members; as the Inter-Cities Fairs Cup was not under the auspices of UEFA, it does not consider teams' records in the Fairs Cup to be part of their European record. FIFA does view the competition as a major honour.

The first round draw paired Burnley with another West German team: VfB Stuttgart. The first leg was played at Stuttgart's Neckarstadion and ended in a 1–1 draw; Burnley's Willie Irvine scored the first goal, but the team ended the match with 10 players after Brian O'Neil was sent off at the end of the game. Burnley won the return leg with a scoreline of 2–0 and progressed to the second round to face Swiss side Lausanne Sports. They defeated Lausanne 8–1 on aggregate; Burnley won 3–1 away and 5–0 at home, with Andy Lochhead scoring a hat-trick in the latter match. The club was paired with Italian club Napoli in the following round. The first leg, at Turf Moor, ended in a 3–0 Burnley victory with goals from Ralph Coates, Les Latcham, and Lochhead, who scored his sixth goal in the competition. Napoli ended the game with 10 men after defender  was sent off for kicking Lochhead in the head. The Italian press previewed the return leg in a belligerent manner: "From Lancashire where studs are made out of rose petals ... to Naples where visiting players are put through a mincing machine at the end of the game and their remains are roasted on a spit". A crowd of 60,000 saw Burnley goalkeeper Harry Thomson make 13 saves, including a penalty kick from José Altafini, as the match ended in a goalless draw. The team coach was escorted to the local airport by a protective convoy to escape the Napoli fans. The Daily Express later hailed Thomson as a "God in a green jersey", while the Burnley Star highlighted the "barbaric conduct shown by the defeated Naples team and their lunatic spectators". The quarter-final draw paired Burnley with Eintracht Frankfurt, the first leg was held in Frankfurt; Brian Miller netted for Burnley in a 1–1 draw. In the return match, Eintracht took a 2–0 lead; Miller halved the score, but the team could not find more goals and were again eliminated by a West German side.

2018–19 UEFA Europa League

Burnley had to wait more than 50 years for their third appearance in a major European football competition. During that period, the club played in all four professional divisions and only avoided relegation to the non-League fifth-tier Football Conference on the last matchday in 1986–87. The team finished in seventh position in the 2017–18 Premier League, which ensured qualification for the 2018–19 UEFA Europa League second qualifying round.

Burnley were drawn against Scottish side Aberdeen, setting up an all-British tie. The first leg at Aberdeen's Pittodrie Stadium ended in a 1–1 draw, after Sam Vokes scored the equaliser for Burnley. The second leg also finished 1–1 after 90 minutes; the game went into extra time, with goals from Jack Cork and Ashley Barnes ensuring a 3–1 win for Burnley. They were paired with Turkish club İstanbul Başakşehir in the third qualifying round. Both games ended in goalless draws after 90 minutes; Cork scored the only goal in extra time in the second leg, setting up a tie with Greek club Olympiacos in the play-off round, the last phase before the group stage. Five Burnley supporters were injured in incidents of violence before the first leg started in Piraeus. Burnley lost 3–1, and ended the match with 10 men after defender Ben Gibson was sent off. Olympiacos owner Evangelos Marinakis had reportedly entered the referee's room at half-time to vent his frustration at the arbiter's performance; Burnley manager Sean Dyche later accused Olympiacos' staff of intimidating the officials. In the return leg, Burnley missed multiple chances to score; the game finished 1–1 with Matěj Vydra scoring on his Burnley debut. The team lost 4–2 on aggregate and went out of the competition.

Record

By season

By competition 

Source:

By location 

Source:

Texaco Cup and Anglo-Scottish Cup 

The Texaco Cup was a competition launched in 1970, involving sides from England, Scotland, Northern Ireland and the Republic of Ireland that had not qualified for UEFA-sanctioned European competitions or the Inter-Cities Fairs Cup. Burnley participated in the inaugural 1970–71 season where they were eliminated in the first round by Scottish side Heart of Midlothian; Burnley won the first leg 3–1 but lost 4–1 in the return match. The club's only other participation in the tournament was in the 1973–74 edition. In the first round, the club was paired with Scottish team East Fife. Burnley won the first match 7–0—a record victory in the competition—and the return leg 3–2 after having been 2–0 behind. The team defeated Heart of Midlothian 8–0 on aggregate in the following round to set up a semi-final with Norwich City. After recording a 2–0 victory in the first leg, Burnley went 2–0 behind in the second match, only to score three times in the last six minutes of the game to progress to the final. They faced Newcastle United, with the final played as a single match at Newcastle's St James' Park. Paul Fletcher scored halfway through the first half to put Burnley in front; Newcastle soon equalised, and the game went to extra time, where the hosts scored again to win 2–1.

In 1975, the Texaco Cup was replaced with the Anglo-Scottish Cup; only English and Scottish clubs participated in the tournament. Burnley competed in the Anglo-Scottish Cup on five occasions between 1976 and 1981. They were eliminated four times in the group stage and progressed to the knockout stage only once, in 1978–79. In that season, the team defeated Preston North End (3–2) and Blackpool (3–1), and drew with Blackburn Rovers (1–1), who also beat Preston and Blackpool; as Burnley twice scored three goals in a match, they received two bonus points while Blackburn received none. Burnley topped the group and progressed to the quarter-final where they faced Celtic. The Scots had started their season with eight consecutive victories, including a 3–1 win in the Old Firm match, before travelling to Turf Moor for the first leg. Steve Kindon scored the game's only goal to give Burnley the victory in front of around 30,000 spectators. The match was marred by crowd violence; Celtic fans hurled bottles, stones and iron railings on police and Burnley fans, who fled on to the pitch, causing 60 injuries. They also defeated Celtic in the away game—a 2–1 victory, the scorers being Ian Brennan and Kindon—to win 3–1 on aggregate and progress to the semi-final to play Mansfield Town. After Burnley won 2–1 at Mansfield, described by the Burnley Express as "one of the greatest acts of soccer robbery", they lost 1–0 at home after extra time. As it finished 2–2 on aggregate, a penalty shoot-out—a first at Turf Moor—was required to determine the winner, which Burnley won 8–7. They faced Oldham Athletic in the final, with the first leg taking place at Oldham's Boundary Park on 5 December 1978. On an icy pitch, Kindon scored in the first minute, with Peter Noble adding a second goal two minutes later. Halfway through the second half, Jim Thomson and Kindon both scored to put Burnley 4–0 up. Oldham netted a consolidation goal in the last minutes of the game, and the team won 4–1. The return leg took place a week later in Burnley, a 1–0 victory for Oldham. Burnley won 4–2 on aggregate to lift the trophy for the first and only time.

In 1981, the Scottish clubs withdrew from the competition as the attendances were low and the English teams were increasingly drawn from the lower leagues. The tournament continued with English entrants only as the Football League Group Cup, which was replaced by the Associate Members' Cup in 1983.

By season 

Key to colours

By competition 

Source:

By location 

Source:

Notes

References
Specific

General

External links
 Clarets in Europe – Clarets Mad

Europe
Burnley